In nineteenth-century British law many crimes were punishable by death, but from 1823, the term "death recorded" was used in cases where the judge wished to record a sentence of death – as legally required – while at the same time indicating his intention to pardon the convict or commute the sentence.

History
Royal pardons for capital punishment had become routine at the time for most common crimes. Under the Judgment of Death Act 1823, a "death recorded" sentence allowed the judge to meet common law sentencing precedent, while avoiding being mocked by the sentenced, or the public, who realised an actual death penalty sentence was likely to be overridden.  As a death sentence had to be delivered orally in court by the judge before a criminal's execution could take place – a written death recorded sentence did not, in practice, represent the death penalty.  The sentence became much less common after the Criminal Law Consolidation Acts 1861 greatly reduced the number of capital offences.

A definition of the term appears in early editions of Ebenezer Cobham Brewer's Dictionary of Phrase and Fable.

The number of offences for which death was nominally the sentence, and the sentence of death being recorded, were criticized at the time of usage both for being capriciously cruel and for uncertainty of actual punishment: 

A misunderstanding of the term led Naomi Wolf, in her 2019 book Outrages: Sex, Censorship, and the Criminalization of Love, to incorrectly claim that there had been a large number of executions for homosexuality in mid-19th-century England. This claim was based on her misreading proceedings of the Old Bailey, and the use of "death recorded" in these records.

References 

Law of the United Kingdom
Sentencing (law)
Capital punishment
Legal fictions
19th century in law